Diethelm Triemer (born 23 July 1954) is a former international speedway rider from East Germany.

Speedway career 
Triemer was a seven times champion of East Germany, winning the East German Championship for seven consecutive years from 1981 until 1987. He was also the East German Longtrack champion in 1980, 1982 and 1983

References 

Living people
1954 births
German speedway riders